Soma Spor Kulübü, colloquially known as Somaspor, is a Turkish professional football club located in Manisa. The club competes at TFF Second League as of 2021–22 season.

Team records

League affiliation
TFF Second League: 2021–
TFF Third League: 2019–2021
Turkish Regional Amateur League: 2013–2019
Super Amateur Leagues: 2005–2013

Honours
TFF Third League
 Winner: 2020–21
Turkish Regional Amateur League
Winners:  2018–19
Super Amateur Leagues
 Manisa Süper Amateur League winners: 2007–08, 2012–13

Current squad

Other players under contract

References

External links
Official club website
Somaspor at TFF

Football clubs in Turkey
TFF Second League
Association football clubs established in 2005
2005 establishments in Turkey
Sport in Manisa